Chelford is a village and civil parish in Cheshire, England, near to the junction of the A537 and A535 roads six miles (10 km) west of Macclesfield and six miles south-east of Knutsford, and is part of the Tatton constituency. The civil parish includes the hamlet of Astle. It is served by Chelford railway station on the line between Crewe and Manchester. At the 2011 census, Chelford had a population of 1,174.

History
In the 15th century the village had a watermill, the Bate Mill. In the late 1780s, Chelford was one of the larger villages in Cheshire, and had several shops. 

A large cattle market was held at Chelford every Monday for over a century, but closed in 2017, the last day of sales being 30 March; business has been transferred to the market at Beeston, and the site is now to be used for housing. As at 17 November 2019 a current Google Earth air view shows the Chelford Market buildings demolished, leaving only foundations.

In 1894, 14 people died in the Chelford rail accident.

Geography and landmarks
Chelford is near the Capesthorne Estate and surrounded by farmland. Almost all inhabitants of the village live on one estate where the only way in or out is via the main road. Local amenities include St John's church, the burial place of former world champion racing cyclist Reg Harris and the venue for an annual cyclists' Christmas Carol service, a post office, a pub/restaurant called The Egerton Arms, and an agricultural supplies business, Chelford Farm Supplies.

See also

Listed buildings in Chelford
St John the Evangelist's Church, Chelford
Chelford Manor House
Astle Hall

References

External links

 The Chelford Village Website
 Chelford Tenants & Residents Association Website
 

Villages in Cheshire
Civil parishes in Cheshire